Embarcadero Media is the parent company of the Palo Alto Weekly, The Almanac of Menlo Park, the Mountain View Voice, the Pleasanton Weekly, The Six Fifty, and Palo Alto Online. It was founded in 1979 by William Johnson, who served as president and CEO until 2022, when he announced that he would retire and be succeeded by Adam Dawes, while remaining chairman of the board of directors.

Mountain View Voice

Kate Wakerly and Carol Torgrimson established the Voice, a monthly independent newspaper in Mountain View, California, in the fall of 1992. They ran operations for a time from Wakerly's basement. In 1994, this newspaper joined Embarcadero Media under founder Bill Johnson, who changed its schedule to a weekly paper. Wakerly remained publisher and gained a staff; she stayed through 2002 when she stepped down because of a breast cancer diagnosis. Tom Gibboney took over the editorship, and Wakerly died of cancer in 2004.

The Voice won a 2014 state newspaper association award for first place in environmental reporting for Daniel Debolt's reporting on TCE, a toxic solvent that computer chip manufacturers discarded in Mountain View in the mid-20th century. These solvents leaked into an aquifer in the northeast part of the city. Justin Scheck also won earlier awards for his work on TCE plumes, and became managing editor in 2001. Candice Shih was named managing editor in 2003, and was succeeded by Don Frances. Gibboney retired from his position as editor and publisher in 2014, handing the reins to Andrea Gemmet, while Renee Batti (editor of the Menlo Park Almanac) serves as associate editor.

References

External links

Companies based in Palo Alto, California
Weekly newspaper companies of the United States
Publishing companies based in the San Francisco Bay Area
American companies established in 1979
Publishing companies established in 1979
1979 establishments in California